Kripa (कृपा) is the concept of divine grace in Hinduism. It is the central tenet of Bhakti Yoga and Bhakti movements, which are seen as reform movements in Hinduism as compared to the Hinduism which finds its origins in the Vedas; though variously it can mean "grace", "mercy", or "blessing", depending upon the context. The Hindi word Kirpala from Sanskrit Kripala means "kind" and is used as a given name for males, while "Kripa" (Kṛpā), is used as a female given name.

Significance of Kripa 

Kripa is akin to similar beliefs prevalent in mysticism of all traditions. In Hinduism as well, the bestowal of divine grace or Kripa is considered an event which catapults a devotee or bhakta into a period of intense personal transformation leading to his Moksha.

Devotional or Bhakti literature available throughout India is replete with references to Kripa as the ultimate key towards realizing the spiritual path of self-realization  In fact, some like the ancient sage Vasistha, in his classical work Yoga Vasistha, considered it to be the only way to transcend the bondage of lifetimes of Karma. He states to Rama that divine grace or Kripa is the only way to help us go beyond the effects of Prarabdha karma, or collection of all the past Karmas, Sanchita karma chosen to experience during a lifetime.

The Hindu philosopher Madhvacharya held that grace was not a gift from God, but rather must be earned.

As Krishna says to Arjuna in the final chapter of the Bhagavad Gita, Verse 18.66, "Setting aside all meritorious deeds (Dharma), just surrender completely to My will (with firm faith and loving contemplation). I shall liberate you from all sins. Do not fear."

Similarly, Adi Shankaracharya composes his famous verse Bhaja Govindam in 8th century, where he declares:
 "Bhajagovindam bhajagovindam
 Govindam bhaja muudhamate
 Sampraapte sannihite kaale
 Nahi nahi rakshati dukrijnkarane.."
 Translation:
Worship Govinda, Worship Govinda,
 Worship Govinda. Oh fool!
 Rules of Grammar will not save you
 At the time of your death.

The Skanda Purana mentions the grace of a Guru in various places, especially in the Uttarakhand, section Guru Strotram, known as Guru Gita, in the form of a dialogue between Shiva and Uma (Shakti):
 "Guru Brahma Guru Vishnu
 Guru Devo Maheshwara
 Guru Sakshat Param Brahma
 Tasmai Shri Gurave Namah"

 "Dhyana Moolam Guru Murti.
 Puja Moolam Gurur Padam,
 Mantra Moolam Gurur Vakyam,
 Moksha Moolam Guru Kripa".

Bhakti movement 

Bhakti or devotion has often remained an ignored aspect in Indian philosophy, hence its significance was lost to majority of the populace. For some time it was considered befitting only to the lower classes and woman, as only the elite were considered able to comprehend the message of the Vedic tradition. Things changed with the revival and reform movements in Hinduism which brought this aspect of Kripa into a new light and made the divine accessible to all, and not just the preserve of the priestly class.

Kinds of Kripa 

Kripa has been categorized in various ways as Ishwara kripa (grace of God), variously Hari Kripa, Shastra kripa (grace of the Scriptures), Guru kripa (grace of the Guru) and lastly Atma kripa (grace of the Self).

See also
 Prasāda

References 

Bhakti movement
Hindu philosophical concepts